8 is the eighth studio album by hip hop record producer Statik Selektah. The album was released on December 8, 2017 by Duck Down Music Inc. and Showoff Records. The album features guest appearances from vocal artists, such as 2 Chainz, Action Bronson, Joey Badass, Termanology, Run The Jewels, The L.O.X., Wale, Royce da 5'9", Joyner Lucas, Raekwon, Mtume, Westside Gunn, Conway the Machine, Sean Price and G-Eazy.

Track listing
All tracks produced by Statik Selektah except track 17, co-produced by The Alchemist.

References

2017 albums
Statik Selektah albums
Albums produced by Statik Selektah